In biology, gonochorism is a sexual system where there are only two sexes and each individual organism is either male or female. The term gonochorism is usually applied in animal species, the vast majority of which are gonochoric. 

Gonochorism contrasts with simultaneous hermaphroditism but it may be hard to tell if a species is gonochoric or sequentially hermaphroditic. (e.g. Parrotfish, Patella ferruginea). However, in gonochoric species individuals remain either male or female throughout their lives. Species that reproduce by thelytokous parthenogenesis and do not have males can still be classified as gonochoric.

Terminology 

The term is derived from Greek  (gone, generation) + (chorizein, to separate). The term gonochorism  originally came from German gonochorismus.

Gonochorism is also referred to as unisexualism or gonochory.

Evolution 

Gonochorism has evolved independently multiple times and is very evolutionary stable in animals. Its stability and advantages have received little attention. Its origin owes to the evolution of anisogamy, it is unclear if the evolution of anisogamy first led to hermaphroditism or gonochorism.

Gonochorism is thought to be ancestral in polychaetes, hexacorallia, nematodes, and hermaphroditic fishes. Gonochorism is thought to be ancestral in hermaphroditic fishes because it is widespread in basal clades of fish and other vertebrate lineages.

Two papers from 2008 have suggested that transitions between hermaphroditism and gonochorism or vice versa have occurred in certain animal taxonomy groups between 10 to 20 times. In a 2017 study involving 165 taxon groups, more evolutionary transitions from gonochorism to hermaphroditism were found than the reverse.

Use across species

Animals 
The term is most often used with animals, in which the species are usually gonochoric.

Gonochorism has been estimated to occur in 95% of animal species. It is very common in vertebrate species, 99% of which are gonochoric. 98% of fishes are gonochoric. Mammals (including humans) and birds are solely gonochoric.

Tardigrades are almost always gonochoric. 75% of snails are gonochoric.

Most arthropods are gonochoric. For example a majority of crustaceans are gonochoric. 

In animals, sex is most often genetically determined, but may be determined by other mechanisms. For example, alligators use temperature-dependent sex determination during egg incubation.

Plants 

Plants which have single-sex individuals are typically called dioecious (vascular plants) or dioicous (bryophytes) instead of gonochoric. In flowering plants, individual flowers may be hermaphroditic (i.e. with both stamens and ovaries) or dioecious (unisexual), having either no stamens (i.e. no male parts) or no ovaries (i.e. no female parts). Among flowering plants with unisexual flowers, some also produce hermaphrodite flowers, and the three types may occur in different arrangements on the same or separate plants. Plant species can thus be hermaphrodite, monoecious, dioecious, trioecious, polygamomonoecious, polygamodioecious, andromonoecious, or gynomonoecious.

 

Examples of species with gonochoric or dioecious pollination include hollies and kiwifruit. In these plants the male plant that supplies the pollen is referred to as the pollenizer.

Other reproductive strategies 
Gonochorism stands in contrast to other reproductive strategies such as asexual reproduction and hermaphroditism. Closely related taxa can have differing sexual strategies – for example, the genus Ophryotrocha contains species that are gonochoric and species that are hermaphrodites.

The sex of an individual may also change during its lifetimethis sequential hermaphroditism can, for example, be found in parrotfish and cockles.

See also 

Diclinous
Monoclinous
Plant sexuality

References 

Reproduction
Pollination
Sexual system